Denzel Bowles (born May 1, 1989) is an American professional basketball player who last played for the Rain or Shine Elasto Painters of the Philippine Basketball Association (PBA).

Professional career

2011–12 season
Bowles began his professional career with BC Šiauliai of the Lithuanian League. There, he averaged 12.6 points per game and 6.4 rebounds per game while playing in 12 games.

On May 6, 2012, Bowles helped the B-Meg Llamados to win the 2012 PBA Commissioner's Cup championship. He was fouled with 1.2 seconds left in the seventh game of the championship series, and nailed both free throws to send the game into overtime and win 90–84. Bowles finished that game with 39 points and 21 rebounds.

2012–13 season
Bowles signed in September 2012 to play for the Zhejiang Golden Bulls of the Chinese Basketball Association (CBA).

In the middle of 2013, Bowles returned to the Philippines for the second time as an import for his former team in the country, now renamed as the San Mig Coffee Mixers, for the 2013 PBA Commissioner's Cup.

2013–14 season
Bowles signed in 2013 to play for the Jilin Northeast Tigers of the Chinese Basketball Association (CBA) after playing for the New Orleans Hornets team in the NBA Summer League.

On March 8, 2014, Bowles signed with the Iowa Energy of the NBA Development League.

2014–15 season
On September 21, 2014, he signed again with the Jilin Northeast Tigers.

On February 21, 2015, he signed with the Purefoods Star Hotshots to replace Daniel Orton after Orton was suspended for a remark Orton made about Manny Pacquiao playing in the league.

2015–16 season
On October 13, 2015, Bowles signed with Marinos de Anzoátegui of the Liga Profesional de Baloncesto, Venezuela's premier basketball league. This is Bowles' first time playing in South America.

In January 2016, Bowles signed again with the Star Hotshots as the team's import for the 2016 PBA Commissioner's Cup. However, in March 2016, Bowles was released by the Hotshots to attend a family matter in the United States.

2016–17 season
He signed a contract with the Lebanese team Al Mouttahed  on January 4 to join the FLB league.

In February 2017, Bowles signed with the TNT KaTropa of the PBA as the team's import for the 2017 PBA Commissioner's Cup. However, on March 16, a day before the conference began, he was declared by the team as "not fit", thus dropping him from the team.

2017–18 season
On September 18, 2017, Bowles signed with the Israeli team Hapoel Eilat for the 2017–18 season. However, on October 25, 2017, he was released by Eilat after appearing in three games.

On March 16, 2018, Bowles signed with San Lázaro of the Dominican Torneo de Baloncesto Superior (TBS). After the season ended, he signed with Sol de América of the Paraguayan Metropolitan Basketball League.

2018–19 season
In May 2019, Bowles returned to the PBA, this time for the Rain or Shine Elasto Painters as their import for the 2019 PBA Commissioner's Cup.

References 

1989 births
Living people
American expatriate basketball people in China
American expatriate basketball people in Israel
American expatriate basketball people in Lithuania
American expatriate basketball people in the Philippines
Basketball players from Virginia
Centers (basketball)
Hapoel Eilat basketball players
Iowa Energy players
James Madison Dukes men's basketball players
Jilin Northeast Tigers players
Kanazawa Samuraiz players
Leones de Ponce basketball players
Philippine Basketball Association imports
Power forwards (basketball)
Sportspeople from Virginia Beach, Virginia
Magnolia Hotshots players
Texas A&M Aggies men's basketball players
Zhejiang Golden Bulls players
American men's basketball players
Rain or Shine Elasto Painters players